Barrio Concha y Toro is a barrio located in Santiago, Chile. The neighborhood has a medieval-like street plan, whose design was influenced by the ideas of Camillo Sitte. The houses are built on the former site of the Díaz Gana Palace's park, which was divided into lots in 1915. The district's boundaries are defined by Brasil Avenue, Avenida Libertador General Bernardo O'Higgins, Cumming Avenue, Romero Street, Maturana Street and Erasmo Escala Street.

References

Geography of Santiago, Chile
National Monuments of Chile